Argut-Dessous is a commune in the Haute-Garonne department in southwestern France. According to the 2013 census it had a population of 28. At the 2018 census the population remained less than 100, with a population of 22 people.

Geography
Located in the Pyrenees, the commune is bordered by four other communes: Saint-Béat-Lez to the north, Fos to the south, Boutx to the east, and finally by Arlos to the west.

Population

See also
Communes of the Haute-Garonne department

References

Communes of Haute-Garonne